Heerlerbaan is a former Dutch village located in the commune of Heerlen, in the province of Dutch Limburg. On 1 January 2008, the area, including the former village had 9872 inhabitants. 

Boroughs of Heerlen
Populated places in Limburg (Netherlands)